Arroz atollado is a Colombian cuisine dish from Cali, Colombia and the surrounding area. It is a typical dish of the Valle del Cauca department. Apart from rice, it contains chicken, pork, potatoes of various kinds, vegetables and seasonings. Arroz atollado may be served with fried plantain pancakes, hogao sauce and sausages.

This typical food was inherited from the Spanish. In Colombia this delicious recipe was adapted mainly by the valley of the cauca and the coast. Initially, it was elaborated in times of sowing and harvest by the Guapi tribes. 

The ingredients are easy to get, between them we have: two red peppers and two yellow peppers, two white onions two cups the diced tomatoes in small squares, carrot and pea, two cups of rice, two chicken breast, bacon or sausage and salt to taste. To prepare this recipe all types of meat are fried, then cook the vegetables, the chicken and the rice and finally everything is mixed. Rice is served with patacon or french fries. This rice is usually prepared on special occasions. It is salty and it has a slightly creamy texture (bland) and part of the meat can be crunchy. Overall, this dish has been chosen as traditional in Colombia.

References

Colombian cuisine
Latin American rice dishes
 Place of origin: Colombia